Tessalit is a rural commune and village in the Kidal Region of Mali. The village is the administrative centre of Tessalit Cercle (district). The commune extends over an area of  that is almost entirely desert. In the 2009 census the commune had a population of 5,739.

It is served by Tessalit Airport.

Tessalit is an oasis in the Sahara desert and a stop for trans-Saharan travellers. A gypsum deposit and a plaster factory also contribute to the local economy, though these activities have been disrupted in recent decades by the Tuareg Rebellions and terrorism in neighboring Algeria.

The Malian government have a military base at the village of Tessalit.

Tessalit is situated in the mountain range of Adrar des Ifoghas. It is primarily populated by Tuaregs and is the home of the musical group Tinariwen as well as the poet Souéloum Diagho. The village is twinned with Saint-Jean-de-Maurienne, France.

The cercle of Tessalit contains the communes of Tessalit, Adjelhoc, and Timtaghene.

Battle of Tessalit

Tuareg rebels defeated Malian government forces to take the village in 2012.  Attempts by the Malian Air Force, using Ukrainian mercenaries, were unable to prevent the defeat.

French paratroopers took the local airport and then were joined by French and African Forces landing at the airport. They recaptured Tessalit on Feb. 8, 2013, according to General Staff spokesman Colonel Thierry Burkhard.

2020
French forces killed the head of Al-Qaeda in the Islamic Maghreb (AQIM), Abdelmalek Droukdel on June 5, 2020, near Tessalit. While France is concentrating its anti-terrorist efforts on the Islamic State in the Greater Sahara (IS-GS), a spokesperson indicated that does not preclude other activities. Droukdel was buried at the scene.

Climate

References

Tuareg
Communes of Kidal Region
Oases of Mali